Heather Mary Peace (born 16 June 1975) is a British actress, musician and LGBT rights activist from Bradford, England. She is best known for her hit role as Nikki Boston in the BBC One school-based drama series Waterloo Road from 2012 to 2014. Her other credits include Sally 'Gracie' Fields in ITV's long-running series London's Burning, Fiona Murray in Kay Mellor's drama series The Chase, Sam Murray in the BBC Scotland drama series Lip Service and as Eve Unwin in the BBC One soap opera EastEnders.

Early life
Heather Peace was born in Bradford, West Yorkshire. She has been playing piano since she was six years old, and guitar since her teens. Peace decided to be an actress at an early age and credits her parents for the encouragement they gave her to achieve that goal. She went to St Joseph's Primary School in Little Horton, Bradford, and St Joseph's Catholic College in Manningham, Bradford. Her mother was a long-serving cantor at St Joseph's Catholic Church (which is next to the primary school) and also did readings. Peace was also a cantor at St Joseph's Catholic Church which is where her love of music and singing started. Peace and her mother are no longer Catholics, due to the Catholic church's stance on LGBT relationships.

Acting career
Peace studied acting at Manchester Metropolitan University, where she obtained a BA(Hons).

Peace's break into television came when she joined the ITV soap opera Emmerdale, playing the character Anne Cullen for seven episodes between January and June 1997.

Her first professional stage role was in the 1997 Harrogate Theatre production of My Fair Lady, playing Eliza Doolittle. She subsequently has played Miranda in Shakespeare's The Tempest and the same character in the actor-musician spoof Return to the Forbidden Planet.

After leaving Emmerdale, Peace took parts in The Bill and Dangerfield, before being cast as Firefighter Sally "Gracie" Fields in the ITV series London's Burning from 1998 until the programme's cancellation in 2002. During this time, Peace made a TV movie called Thunder Road, in which she played Sonia.

Between 2003 and 2005, Peace played minor roles in television series including Casualty and Where the Heart Is.

Peace played Special Air Service Trooper Becca Gallagher on the ITV action series Ultimate Force alongside Ross Kemp. Becca was part of the 3rd and 4th series, aired between 2005 and 2008. Peace has given credit to the writers for making Becca 'one of the lads', rather than an overly emotional character and said she had 'so much fun' playing the hero in the show. Ross Kemp has argued the show is made far more interesting by including a female role and believes Peace was the perfect choice for the part ("she is absolutely superb").

During 2006 and 2007, Peace starred in Kay Mellor's TV series The Chase as single mum Fiona Jones. Quite a different character to the action girls often played by Peace, Fiona is portrayed as a left out family member whose resentment and betrayals lead into unexpected sinister behaviour.

She then appeared in television series including Coronation Street, Heartbeat and Holby City. In 2008, Peace appeared as the secretly abusing wife in the "Private Sins" episode of Blue Murder.

She also starred in the film 31 North 62 East where Peace plays again part of a Special Air Service unit. Peace is Captain Jill Mandelson, who will seek help in her twin Kimberly (also played by Peace) to unfold the political corruption that lead to the death of the rest of her unit.

In 2010, Peace was cast as Detective Sergeant Sam Murray in the BBC Three TV series Lip Service. Peace argued that being the only openly lesbian cast member influenced the attention she received regarding the show. The series revolves around the loves and lives of group of aged-30-something lesbians in Glasgow, Scotland. The show reached cult status within the first few episodes, with Peace's character Sam, and the actor herself, becoming also the object of a cult following ("Team Sam" movement among fans of the show). Filming of the second series finished in July 2011 with a transmission date of spring 2012. Since the end of the second and final season fans of the drama called for a third season to be made but Peace said in an interview with Cult Box where she said she would 'definitely' return as the character.

In 2011, Peace was cast as Head of English, Nikki Boston, before being appointed Deputy Headteacher in 2013 for the BBC One school-based drama series, Waterloo Road. Following a tour of her debut album, she returned to the series for the second part of Series 8. She also featured in Series 9, which screened on BBC One in September 2013. She took another break from Waterloo Road at the end of Series 9 Spring Term but has hinted that she may return in Series 11.

In 2014, Peace took part in ITV's three-part drama Prey as Abi Farrow, wife of main character Detective Constable Marcus Farrow (played by BAFTA nominee John Simm). The drama was directed by BAFTA winner Nick Murphy.

In 2016, she appeared in the BBC TV series The Coroner Episode 2.3: "Those in Peril" as Chrissy Woodward. In 2019, she appeared in Series 22 of Silent Witness as DI Murphy. Peace later played Alex Dawson in the BBC One medical drama, Holby City.

In 2019 she hosted a two part chat and music show called Heather Peace at the Bedford on the brand new digital TV channel Diva Box Office, which is the first lesbian digital TV channel in Europe. Guests interviewed on the show include Saara Aalto, Sinitta, Desiree Akhavan, and Alicya Eyo, with Saara Aalto performing her song "Dance Like Nobody's Watching" and Lots Holloway (formerly known as Charlie Rundle from MK1) performing her song "Naked".

In 2021, it was announced that Peace would be joining the cast of BBC soap opera EastEnders as Eve Unwin, the wife of Stacey Slater (Lacey Turner).

Singing career
Peace was classically trained at piano since she was six years old, and later learned guitar.

She held a jazz residency at Velvet while she attended drama school.

In a 2000 episode of London's Burning, Peace's character sang a version of the Bette Midler classic The Rose. Subsequently, released by BMG, it reached no. 58 in the UK charts. She decided to put her music career on hold to concentrate on acting but in 2011 she reignited her love of music with her first sell out UK tour and release of an acoustic album of covers and some original songs.

She recorded her full debut jazz album Fairytales with producer Nigel Wright. Following release on 21 May 2012, it achieved number 43 in the UK Albums Chart and number 9 in the independent albums chart, supported by a UK tour. Heather's Fairytales UK tour culminated with a concert in London, where Peace shared a duet with Alison Moyet.

In 2013, she released a new single, a Jack Guy remix of "Fight For" available on iTunes, and a special edition of her debut album "Fairytales". She has toured Australia twice, where she has taken part in the Sydney Mardi Gras performing on stage as well as hosting the event for the SBS TV.

On 9 June 2014, the single "We Can Change", and her second studio album The Thin Line were officially released. Peace launched the new single with Europe's first rainbow crossing, in Brighton.

All the songs in "The Thin Line" (as well as her previous studio album, Fairytales) are written by Peace. Some of the tracks, however, are the result of a joined work with other songwriters. Such is the case of the single "We Can Change", written by Peace and Shelly Poole, or the song "Lily" (freely available to download from her official website), a co-write by Peace and her guitarist Michael Clancy.

Peace worked in this new album with producer James Lewis, both having a "duty of care" on it. Her focus on her music (she took a break from acting), as well as the extensive work on the album, that did not finish until they both (musician and producer) were perfectly satisfied with it, concluded in The Thin Line, an album she is incredibly proud of.

Following the release of the album, Peace performed in a number of festivals over the summer. The Thin Line tour, during which Peace and her band performed the songs from the new album, took place in October 2014. An acoustic tour followed in March / April and September / October 2015.

Peace announced her plans for a new EP, as well as a European and a full band UK Tour in Spring 2016.

In February 2016, Peace launched a PledgeMusic project for the release of her new EP, Come Home. The support of her fans led to raising 75% of the funds in 24 hours, reaching the project target in under a week. The Come Home EP was released on 8 April 2016.

For her new EP, Peace chose to work again with her producer from The Thin Line, James Lewis, and has said James brings out the best in her.  Peace described Come Home as a love story, from meeting to breaking up, in 20 minutes.

Personal life and activism
Peace came out as a lesbian to her mother when she was 19 years old, shortly after she broke up with her first girlfriend. Peace and longtime partner Ellie Dickinson entered into a civil partnership in 2013, and subsequently converted it to marriage in 2014. They have three daughters together: Annie Mary, born to Dickinson in April 2015, and twins Jessie and Lola, born to Peace in June 2017.

Peace is a prominent supporter of LGBT equality causes. She is a patron of Manchester Pride and has recorded a video for Stonewall's "It Gets Better" campaign. She is involved in a number of related charities, including Diversity Role Models and The Albert Kennedy Trust.

Peace has hosted and curated her own "Heather Peace Presents" stage in several editions of Manchester Pride. In July 2016 Diva announced Peace as its new columnist. Peace said it was an honour for her to be part of a magazine that was relevant to her coming out.

In 2010, she was number 40 on the Independent on Sundays Pink List, and number 10 in 2011. She was also voted number 18 on US website afterellen.com's 2011 Hot 100 list. She is also the only woman to have appeared twice on the cover of Diva Magazine in the space of six months.

Discography

Albums

Extended plays

Singles

References

External links
 
 
 
 
 
 

1975 births
Living people
English soap opera actresses
Alumni of Manchester Metropolitan University
Actresses from Bradford
Musicians from Bradford
Actresses from Yorkshire
English lesbian actresses
English LGBT musicians
English LGBT rights activists
British LGBT singers
Lesbian musicians
English pop singers
English LGBT actors
21st-century English women singers
21st-century English singers
20th-century English actresses
21st-century English actresses
20th-century LGBT people
21st-century LGBT people